Timur Kanokov (born September 24, 1972, Shithala, Kabardino-Balkarian Autonomous Soviet Socialist Republic) is a Russian political figure and a deputy of the 8th State Dumas.
 
Over the years, Kanokov worked as an advisor to the Governor of Smolensk Oblast, Vice President for Capital Construction and Internal Development of the Association of Wholesale and Retail Markets. In 2016, he participated in the elections for the 7th State Duma; however, upon the results of the elections, Kanokov did not join the Duma. Since September 2021, he has served as deputy of the 8th State Duma.

References
 

 

1963 births
Living people
A Just Russia politicians
21st-century Russian politicians
Eighth convocation members of the State Duma (Russian Federation)